The 1986 Wellington local elections were part of the 1986 New Zealand local elections, to elect members to sub-national councils and boards. The Wellington elections cover one regional council (the Greater Wellington Regional Council), eight territorial authority (city and district) councils, three district health boards, and various local boards and licensing trusts. The polling was conducted using the standard first-past-the-post electoral method.

Wellington City Council
The Wellington City Council consists of a mayor and nineteen councillors elected from seven wards (Brooklyn, Eastern, Karori, Lambton, Northern, Otari, Southern).

Mayor

Brooklyn Ward
The Brooklyn Ward elects two members to the Wellington City Council

Eastern Ward
The Eastern Ward elects four members to the Wellington City Council

Karori Ward
The Karori Ward elects two members to the Wellington City Council

Lambton Ward
The Lambton Ward elects three members to the Wellington City Council

Northern Ward
The Northern Ward elects three members to the Wellington City Council

Otari Ward
The Otari Ward elects four members to the Wellington City Council

 
 
 
 
 
 
 
 
 

Table footnotes:

Southern Ward
The Southern Ward elects three members to the Wellington City Council

Wellington Harbour Board

Wellington Hospital Board

Wellington Regional Council

References

External links
Photo of election hoardings

Wellington
Politics of the Wellington Region
1980s in Wellington
Wellington